Linda L. Doucett (born July 2, 1954) is an American actress and model. She had a supporting role on The Larry Sanders Show and appeared in Playboy magazine. She also appeared in Herman's Head, Tales from the Crypt, and the made-for-television film "Badge of Betrayal".

Career
Doucett began her modeling career in high school and got her start in acting by working as an extra in music videos for bands, such as Toto and the Beach Boys.

From 1992 to 1994, she played Darlene Chapinni, a devoted assistant to the titular host's sidekick Hank Kingsley, on The Larry Sanders Show. She was a regular for the first three seasons and replaced by Scott Thompson in 1994 after the first episode of the fourth season.

In 1993, Doucett posed in the September issue of Playboy. The release of that issue of Playboy coincided with the episode Broadcast Nudes of The Larry Sanders Show where her character is fictionally asked to pose for Playboy as well.

Personal life
Doucett met Garry Shandling at a party and dated him from 1987 to 1994. In 1994, when their relationship ended, Shandling had her dismissed from The Larry Sanders Show. In turn, Doucett filed a lawsuit against Shandling and producer Brad Grey's company Brillstein-Grey Entertainment for sexual harassment and wrongful termination, which was settled out of court in 1997 for $1 million.

In 2008, Doucett testified along with Shandling, Sylvester Stallone, and others against Anthony Pellicano for illegal wiretapping and other crimes.

Filmography

Film

Television

Appearances

References

External links
 

1954 births
Living people
American film actresses
Actresses from Pittsburgh
1990s Playboy Playmates
21st-century American women